Zerzura is a mythical city or oasis located in the Sahara Desert.

The rumor
Zerzura was long rumored to have existed deep in the desert west of the Nile River in Egypt or Libya. In writings dating back to the 13th century, the authors spoke of a city which was "white as a dove" and called it "The Oasis of Little Birds". In the Kitab al Kanuz, Zerzura is said to be a city in the Sahara full of treasure with a sleeping king and queen. The city is guarded by black giants who keep anyone from going in and coming out. However, this may be a reference to the black Tebu people, nomads in Chad and Libya whose ancestors used to raid oases out in the Sahara.

"The first European reference to Zerzura is in an 1835 account by the English Egyptologist John Gardner Wilkinson, based on a report by an Arab who said he had found the oasis while searching for a lost camel. Placed five days west of the track connecting the oases of Farafra and Bahariya, the "Oasis called Wadee Zerzoora" abounded "in palms, with springs, and some ruins of uncertain date." Although tales of secret desert locales found by searchers for stray camels were common enough, Wilkinson's account was bolstered when later explorers found a number of previously unknown oases that had been named in his account along with Zerzura. But they did not find Zerzura itself."

More recently, European explorers made forays into the desert in search of Zerzura but never succeeded in finding it. Notable twentieth-century explorers Ralph Bagnold of Britain, and the Hungarian László (Ladislaus) Almásy led an expedition to search for Zerzura from 1929–1930 using Ford Model A trucks. In 1932 the Almásy–Patrick Clayton expedition reconnaissance flights discovered two valleys in the Gilf Kebir. In the following year, Almásy found the third of the "Zerzura" wadis, actually rain oases in the remote desert. On the other hand, Bagnold considered Zerzura as a legend that could never be solved by discovery.

The participants of the Zerzura hunt created the Zerzura Club in a bar in Wadi Halfa upon their return in 1930. Many of the club's members remained friends and several went on to serve as officers in the British Army during World War II.  Many served in the Long Range Desert Patrol during the North African Campaign.  Only Almásy served Rommel's Afrika Korps and assisted the Italians.

Zerzura the white city

According to the historical writings from the scribes of an emir in Benghazi, Libya in 1481, a camel driver named Hamid Keila came to Benghazi in bad shape and recounted to the emir that he had been to the city of Zerzura. Apparently Hamid Keila and a caravan had been heading out from the Nile River to the oases of Dakhla (Darkhla/Dakhilah) and Kharga (Kharijah) and were caught in a vicious sandstorm that killed everyone except Keila who apparently survived under the shelter of his dead camel. After the storm passed, the man had emerged from the camel to find himself confused by the lie of the land because the storm changed all the familiar landmarks. It was when Keila was becoming delirious from having no water that a group of strange men found him. The men were said to be tall with fair hair and blue eyes, carrying straight swords instead of Arab scimitars, who then took the camel driver back to a city called Zerzura to tend to him. Zerzura was indeed described as a white city that was approachable through a wadi (valley) that ran between two mountains, and from the wadi was a road that lead to the gates of the city which had a carving of a strange bird above them. Within the city were white houses of inner luxury, palms, springs, and pools that were used by fair-skinned women and children for washing and bathing. Hamid Keila recounted that the Zerzurans, or "El Suri", treated him with kindness and spoke a strange form of Arabic that was difficult for him to understand but was carefully explained to him by the Suri, who apparently weren't Muslim because the women wore no veils and no mosques could be found in the city, nor did Hamid Keila hear any calls to prayer by a muezzin.

The camel driver told this story to the emir months after being in Zerzura, and the emir asked him how it was that he came to be in Benghazi at present. Hamid grew uncomfortable with the questioning and told him that he had escaped from Zerzura one night. The emir then asked why it was necessary to escape if the Suri treated him with kindness, and the camel driver had trouble explaining. The emir suspected something strange and had Keila searched by his guards, who found a precious ruby set in a gold ring hidden on the man. The emir then asked how he got the ring, but Keila couldn't say. Figuring he'd stolen it from the Suri, the emir had Keila taken out into the desert to have his hands cut off. The emir believed the man's story because he and his men later went out into the wasteland to find Zerzura, but never did, though it is possible that the emir did not look in the right area of the desert.

According to unknown sources, the ring supposedly came into possession of Libya's King Idris, who was overthrown in 1969 by Muammar al-Gaddafi and his Revolutionary Command Council. It is said that the ring has been studied by many experts who claim it is of great value, and it is speculated that it was crafted by Europeans in the 12th century, suggesting that the Zerzurans who had it before Hamid Keila stole it may have been the remnants of early European crusaders who got lost in the Sahara on their way to or back from Jerusalem and set up their own habitat in the desert. However, there oddly seems to be no information about the supposed ring made available by any sources, nor is there any evidence of its existence. Furthermore, because Hamid Keila was the narrator of the Zerzura tale, it is possible that he may have been the anonymous author of the Kitab al Kanuz (Book of Hidden Treasures) since his plight occurred in the 15th century, as the manuscript was also published at that time.

Books and articles about Zerzura 

 Unknown Sahara (Ismeretlen Szahara) by László Almásy (Budapest, 1934) describing his expeditions in search of Zerzura. German translation Unbekannte Sahara (Leipzig, 1939).
 Récentes Explorations dans le Désert Libyque by László Almásy (Cairo, 1936) – a publication summarizing the results of the successful search for Zerzura
 German translation by Klaus Kurre in Mythos Zarzura. Belleville, Munich 2020, ISBN 978-3-936298-18-5
 In Search of Zerzura by Orde Wingate, in The Geographical Journal, Vol. 83, No. 4 (1934), pp. 281-308. Published by The Royal Geographical Society. DOI: 10.2307/1786487
 The Hunt for Zerzura: the lost oasis and the desert war (2002) about members of the Zerzura Club in World War II by Saul Kelly
 The English Patient (1992) by Michael Ondaatje was loosely based on Almásy's life
 Pirates of the Caribbean: The Price of Freedom has a main storyline setting on Zerzura, as the story bases on slavery, from the viewpoint of Captain Jack Sparrow.
 Ice Cold In Alex by Christopher Landon mentions Zerzura several times.
 The Eye of Ra a gothic mystery novel by desert explorer Michael Asher, connects Zerzura to the Pharaoh Akhnaten, alien visitations, and UFO
 The Oasis of the Last Story - Tales from the Desert, is a fictionalized autobiography by explorer and former SAS man Michael Asher  about his 40 year quest for the lost oasis on foot and with camels, told as a single journey, and about his spiritual awakening in the desert.
 Lost Oasis fiction about Zerzura Oasis and the lost army of king Cambyses by T.M. Bown, published by Story Merchant Books
 Biggles Flies South by captain W. E. Johns (1938) is a fictional account of three British airmen who discover Zerzura
 The Lost Oasis, a Doc Savage novel by Kenneth Robeson (Lester Dent), September 1933, takes place largely in Zerzura.
The Hidden Oasis (Bantam Books, 2009) by Paul Sussman. An intelligent modern-day archaeology thriller.

Films about Zerzura 
Zerzura (Sahel Sounds, 2017) directed by Christopher Kirkley. Feature-length ethnofiction shot in the Sahara desert.

Notes

References
 The Book of Hidden Treasures (Kitab al Kanuz)

External links
 Washington Times book review of Saul Kelly's Hunt for Zerzura
 Excerpts from the English Patient about Zerzura
 Quote from the 15th Century about Zerzura
 http://www.askwhy.co.uk/analogiesandconjectures/Zerzura01.php
 https://www.scribd.com/doc/22040577/11-2009-Never-Heard-of-Zerzura

Fictional populated places in Egypt
Mythological populated places
Oases of Africa